Médéric Henry (born ) is a French male volleyball player. He is part of the France men's national volleyball team. On club level he plays for Arago de Sète.

References

External links
 profile at FIVB.org

1995 births
Living people
French men's volleyball players
Place of birth missing (living people)